Desocodeine is a semi-synthetic opioid which is the penultimate intermediate in the manufacture of desomorphine from codeine.

References

Opioids